Raphael was a Japanese visual kei rock band that formed in 1997, when the members were only 15. They disbanded in 2001, after guitarist Kazuki died at age 19. The remaining members reunited Raphael for two concerts in 2012 and for a 2016 tour.

Biography
Kazuki and Yukito originally worked together in a punk cover band in 1995, prior to Raphael's formation. After both Kazuki and Yukito began writing their own material, Yukito formed Raphael in 1997, and was later joined by Kazuki, vocalist Yuki and finally drummer Hiro,  and Raphael had their first concert on December 10, 1997. Their first album Lilac was released in 1998 and was followed with a home video. They charted on the Oricon chart for the first time when their song "Yume Yori Suteki na" was used for the TBS show . They released two singles on the same day, one hitting number 37, and one number 38.

In 1999 their major label debut, "Hanasaku Inochi Aru Kagiri", reached number 25 on the Oricon. Their later releases centered about graduation because it was around the time the members would have graduated from high school, had they not dropped out to pursue music. They performed their first show at the Nippon Budokan in March 2000.

However, on October 31, 2000, guitarist Kazuki died of a sedative overdose. In January 2001, after finishing a nationwide tour, Raphael decided to disband. Yuki and Hiro went on to form Rice, while Yukito formed Black Love.

Raphael's song "Yume Yori Suteki na" was covered by Dog in the Parallel World Orchestra on the compilation Crush! -90's V-Rock Best Hit Cover Songs-. The album was released on January 26, 2011 and features current visual kei bands covering songs from bands that were important to the '90s visual kei movement.

On April 7, 2012, it was announced that the remaining members Yuki, Yukito and Hiro would reunite Raphael for two nights at Zepp Tokyo on October 31 and November 1. With Yuki claiming he had made the decision back in 2010, while visiting Kazuki's grave. The shows featured Anchang (Sex Machineguns), Lida (Dacco, Psycho le Cému), Sakito (Nightmare) and Yumehito (AYABIE) as guest guitarists. They released a single under the name "Raphael -Starring Kazuki-" on the day of the first show; a re-recording of their hit 1999 single "Eternal Wish (Todokanu Kimi e)" that also includes the previously unreleased songs "Dear", "Haikei Nervous" and "Elf no Yuutsu". A 2-disc live album of the two concerts titled Tenshi no Hinoki Butai was released on December 26 and includes 30 songs. Footage from both reunion concerts was also released on DVD that same day, titled Tenshi no Hinoki Butai Dai Ichi Ya "Hakuchumu", while the second show was released on January 30, 2013 as Tenshi no Hinoki Butai Dai Ni Ya "Kokuchumu".

In 2016, Raphael reunited for several concerts, including the nationwide tour Iyashikoya which began in May. The album Never -1997040719990429- was released on May 18 and is composed of re-recordings of songs from their indie period. The albums covering their major label recordings, Ending -1999072319991201- and Love Story -2000020220161101-, followed on August 3 and October 26 respectively.

Members
 – vocals
 – bass guitar, contrabass, backing vocals
 – drums

Former member
 – guitars, backing vocals, main songwriter, leader

Discography
Albums and mini-albums
Lilac (April 7, 1998)
Mind Soap (December 1, 1999) Oricon Album Chart Weekly Top Position: 30
 50
 17
Raphael Singles (August 1, 2001, compilation album) 25
Tenshi no Hinoki Butai (December 26, 2012, live album) 133
Never -1997040719990429- (May 18, 2016, self-cover album) 57
Ending -1999072319991201- (August 3, 2016, self-cover album) 42
Love Story -2000020220161101- (October 26, 2016, self-cover album) 36

Singles
"White Love Story" (November 1, 1998)

"Sweet Romance" (April 29, 1999) Oricon Single Chart Weekly Top Position: 38
 37
 25
 28
"Promise" (November 20, 1999) 32
"Lost Graduation" (February 2, 2000) 40
"Evergreen" (August 23, 2000) 28
 24
"Eternal Wish (Todokanu Kimi e)" (October 31, 2012, re-recording) 24

Demo tape
"Eternal Wish (Todokanu no Kimi e)" (December 24, 1997)

Home videos
VHS
Lilac: Vision of Extremes (August 1, 1998, PVs)
Lilac: Vision of Extremes II (September 20, 1999, PVs)
Pictorial Poem (March 24, 2000, PVs)
Raphael Special Live "Graduation" -2000.3.4 Nippon Budokan- (August 23, 2000, concert)
Forever and Ever (April 25, 2001, making of)
Pictorial Poem 2 (September 19, 2001, PVs)
Last (September 19, 2001, concert)
First (September 19, 2001, concert)

DVD
Forever and Ever (April 25, 2001, making of)
Raphael Clips (September 19, 2001, PVs)
Last (September 21, 2001, concert)
First (September 21, 2001, concert)
Tenshi no Hinoki Butai Dai Ichi Ya "Hakuchumu" (December 26, 2012, concert) Oricon DVD Chart Weekly Top Position: 45
Tenshi no Hinoki Butai Dai Ni Ya "Kokuchumu" (January 30, 2013, concert) 26

References

External links
Official website 
For Life Music Entertainment page 

Visual kei musical groups
Japanese progressive rock groups
Japanese art rock groups
Musical groups established in 1997
Musical groups disestablished in 2001
Musical groups reestablished in 2012
Musical groups reestablished in 2016